The Basic Income Alliance (abbreviated BGE) is a German single-issue political party that advocates for an unconditional basic income. It was founded in September 2016 in Munich. The Basic Income Alliance gained 97,539 votes at the German federal election 2017 and reached 0.2%.

Overview 
The Basic Income Alliance sees an unconditional basic income as a central possibility to counteract what it sees as a widening income gap. Technical progress, the automation of production processes, the resulting unemployment and low-paid gainful employment (working poverty) lead to a division in society that must be overcome in order to maintain social peace.

Election results

Other "basic income parties" 

There are a number of other political parties in other countries that are formed solely around a universal basic income proposal. These include:

 Basinkomstpartiet, Sweden
 The Basic Income Party, Korea (Korean: 기본소득당; Hanja: 基本所得黨)
 The Base (Dutch: De Basis)

Other political parties also include universal basic income among their policies but do not exclusively focus on it.

See also
 Universal basic income in Germany

References

External links
  (German)

Single-issue political parties
Political parties in Germany
Political parties established in 2016
2016 establishments in Germany
Universal basic income in Germany
Political parties supporting universal basic income